The 1950-51 Oberliga season was the third season of the Oberliga, the top level of ice hockey in Germany. 12 teams participated in the league, and Preußen Krefeld won the championship.

First round

North

West

South

Qualification for final round 
 EC Bad Tölz – Krefelder EV  2:3
 Krefelder EV – Düsseldorfer EG 5:2

Final round

Relegation  
 EV Rosenheim - EV Tegernsee 2:0

References 

Oberliga (ice hockey) seasons
West
Ger